L. mexicana  may refer to:
 Leishmania mexicana, a protozoan parasite species
 Lucilia mexicana, a green bottle blow fly species found from southwestern North America to Brazil

See also
 Mexicana (disambiguation)